The 2012–13 Svenska Cupen was the 57th season of Svenska Cupen and the first season since 2000–01 to be held according to the fall-spring season format. The season also reintroduced a group stage, the first since 1995–96.

A total of 96 clubs entered the competition. The first round commenced on 3 June 2012 and the final was contested on 26 May 2013 at Friends Arena in Solna. Helsingborgs IF were the defending champions, having beaten Kalmar FF 3–1 in last season's final.

IFK Göteborg won their sixth Svenska Cupen title on 26 May 2013 after defeating Djurgårdens IF 3–1 on penalties after the match had finished 1–1 after extra time.

Teams

Qualifying rounds 

The only one of the Swedish District Football Associations that had a qualifying round was Dalarnas FF, the other ones decided their teams in other ways. The first round commenced on 3 March 2012 and the final was contested on 22 May 2012.

Round 1
64 teams from the third tier or lower of the Swedish league system competed in this round. The round was played between 3 June and 5 August 2012 with the majority of the fixtures played in early August.

Round 2
All teams from 2012 Allsvenskan and 2012 Superettan entered in this round, 32 teams in total, where they were joined by the 32 winners from round 1. The 32 teams from Allsvenskan and Superettan were seeded and played against the 32 winners from round 1, the matches were played at the home venues for the unseeded teams. The fixtures were drawn on 6 August 2012 and the round was initially scheduled to be played between 16 and 20 August 2012, however three fixtures were postponed to later dates due to clashes with Allsvenskan and European cup play.

Group stage
The 32 winners from round 2 were divided into eight groups of four teams. The 16 highest ranked winners from the previous rounds were seeded to the top two positions in each groups and the 16 remaining winners were unseeded in the draw. The ranking of the 16 seeded teams were decided by league position in the 2012 season. All teams in the group played each other once, the highest ranked teams from the previous rounds and lower tier teams had the right to play two home matches. The group stage was played in March 2013. The draw for the group stage was held on 13 November 2012.

Tie-breaking criteria and key
If two or more teams are equal on points on completion of the group matches, the following criteria are applied to determine the rankings
superior goal difference
higher number of goals scored
result between the teams in question
higher league position in the 2012 season

Group 1

Group 2

Group 3

Group 4

Group 5

Group 6

Group 7

Group 8

Knockout stage

Qualified teams

Bracket

Quarter-finals
The quarter-finals were played on 3 and 4 April 2013 and consisted of the eight teams that won their respective group in the previous round. The four best group winners were entitled to play the match at their home venue. The draw for the quarter-finals took place on 17 March 2013, with IK Sirius from Division 1 remaining as the lowest-ranked team.

Semi-finals
The semi-finals were played on 1 May 2013 and consisted of the four winners from the quarter-finals. The teams drawn first were the home teams. The draw for the semi-finals took place on 8 April 2013, with Örgryte IS from Superettan remaining as the lowest-ranked team.

Final

The final was played on 26 May 2013 at Friends Arena, Solna. The home team was designated through a draw.

References

External links
 Official site 
 2012–13 Svenska Cupen at Soccerway

Svenska Cupen seasons
Cupen
Cupen
Sweden